Waitomo District Council is the territorial authority for the Waitomo District of New Zealand.

The council is led by the mayor of Waitomo, who is currently . There are also six ward councillors.

Composition

Councillors

 Mayor 
 Urban ward: Guy Whitaker, Janene New
 Rural ward: Lisa Marshall, Phil Brodie, Sue Smith, Allan Goddard

History

The area came under the authority of Awakino County Council and Waitomo County Council until 1922, Otorohanga County Council from 1922 to 1976, and previous Waitomo District Council entity from 1976 to 1989. The current council was established in 1989.

References

External links

 Official website

Waitomo District
Politics of Waikato
Territorial authorities of New Zealand